The Shire of Kolan was a local government area located in the Wide Bay–Burnett region of Queensland, Australia, to the west of Bundaberg.

The major industries in the area include cattle and sugar cane.

History

Kolan Division was created on 11 November 1879 as one of the original 74 divisions around Queensland under the Divisional Boards Act 1879 with a population of 1171.

On 28 January 1886, the region north of the Burnett River was excised from Kolan Division to create a separate Gooburrum Division.

With the passage of the Local Authorities Act 1902, Kolan Division became the Shire of Kolan on 31 March 1903.

On 15 March 2008, under the Local Government (Reform Implementation) Act 2007 passed by the Parliament of Queensland on 10 August 2007, the Shire of Kolan merged with the Shires of Burnett and Isis and the City of Bundaberg to form the Bundaberg Region.

Towns and localities
The Shire of Kolan included the following settlements:

 Gin Gin
 Bullyard
 Bungadoo
 Kalpowar
 Maroondan
 McIlwraith
 Tirroan
 Wallaville

Chairmen
 1927: C. M. English

Population

External links
 Queensland Places: Kolan Shire

References

Former local government areas of Queensland
2008 disestablishments in Australia
Populated places disestablished in 2008
1879 establishments in Australia